Arthur C. E. Summers (1909–1934) was a swimmer who competed for England.

Diving career
Summers won a bronze medal in the 3×110 yard medley relay at the 1934 British Empire Games in London.

Personal life
He married Lily Chapman in 1930 but was found dead in his bath at his home in Hornsey just seven years later: the death was reported from as natural causes.

References

1909 births
1937 deaths
English male swimmers
Swimmers at the 1934 British Empire Games
Commonwealth Games medallists in swimming
Commonwealth Games bronze medallists for England
Medallists at the 1934 British Empire Games